David John Smith  (born 2 March 1989 in Eastleigh) is a Paralympian who made his Paralympic debut on the British boccia team that won the gold medal at the 2008 Summer Paralympics. He competed for Great Britain at the 2012 Summer Paralympics and did so winning Bronze in the Team BC1–2. and Silver in the BC1 individual event watched by a record Boccia crowd at the Excel arena. David competed for Paralympics GB for a third time in Rio where he won Gold in the individual BC1 event for the first time in his career. David held the 'triple crown' of major tournament wins following his win at the World Championships in Liverpool 2018 until the World Championships in Rio 2022 where he claimed Silver. David is now the holder of three Paralympic Gold Medals, after winning at the 2020 Tokyo Paralympics, making him the most decorated British Boccia player in history and the first BC1 to defend a Paralympic title, He was selected to carry the GB flag in the Tokyo 2020 closing ceremony.

Early life and family
He was born at Southampton General Hospital, the son of Mary Windless (1952–present) and Clive Smith (1953–present). David was the first of two children; he was born two years before his sister Dawn. David was brought up in Eastleigh.

Education

Early years and Primary school
David was diagnosed with cerebral palsy at one year of age, and went to a developmental centre in Winchester for disabled children. Aged three, he went to Cedar School, Southampton for special needs children. David first played Boccia aged six at Cedar School when the school competed at National junior games in Stoke Mandeville. Throwing sideways, David never really won a game and the sport took time to ignite his interest. The school really struggled to challenge David and his potential to learn was being held back by the lack of academic ability of his peers.

Secondary school
After a long battle with the council, David's parents managed to get David a place at Treloar School. Aged eleven, David finally changed schools and went to Treloar School in September 2000. Immediately David began to flourish, his confidence grew rapidly and he really developed his talent for Boccia, drumming, wheelchair hockey, wheelchair football and Para-athletics. He became the youngest ever player to win the British Boccia Championships at the age of fourteen and won numerous national titles in the other sports. David was elected head boy in 2004 and managed the wheelchair hockey and football sessions.

College
The move to college was straight forward for David as it was the same organisation. Whilst at Treloar College, David attended Alton College to complete his A'levels in Physics and Maths. The demands of his, now international, Boccia career meant that a lot of the hobbies he had at school had to be phased out.

University
After the Beijing Paralympics, David went to Swansea University to study Aerospace Engineering. Due to Boccia, David took six years to complete his degree. However, David was able to set up a permanent base in Swansea with the sports support services and facilities necessary to remain successful.

International Boccia

Early career
Coached by Barry Bowden since he started Treloar, David joined the England and Wales squad in 2004 soon after his first British title. David's international debut followed the same year. David went to the European Championships in 2005, his first Major ranking international. There he beat the world ranked number 6 player 6–0 in a pool game and got all the way to the quarter-finals. In the team event, he helped the England team secure a silver medal. David had a disappointing second major in 2006 this time representing GB, where he finished 13th and the team got a bronze at the World Championships in Rio. In 2007, David became double world champion at the age of 18. Sadly, Barry decided to step down as his coach after this tournament after 7 years together following disputes with the new GB squad. David competed in Beijing in 2008 but due to the continued coaching issue only managed 13th individually. The team did much better and inspired by his teammate Nigel, David raised his game and helped the team achieve a historic Paralympic Gold.

Middle career
After Beijing, David built up a friendship with Sarah Nolan who in 2010 became his coach. New management in the GB squad helped David untie the bad practices of the previous era and slowly the sport became professional. In 2009, David won his first Europeans to become a world-ranked number 1 for the first time. In 2010, David and the team lost in the quarter-finals to Tadtong of Thailand at the World Championships. Drastic changes were needed and Sarah started reworking how David played the game to suit the new style of play from Asia. In 2011, Sarah became David's permanent on-court assistant. In 2012, David won two medals at the Paralympics for the first time.
In 2013, Claire Morrison became David's coach whilst Sarah remained his on-court assistant. David took over as captain of the team from Nigel and won double gold at the Europeans that year. 
In 2014, David became world champion for a second time winning the final spectacularly 8–2.
In 2015, David captained the team to another European Gold and the team gained an automatic slot for the Rio Paralympics.
In 2016, David claimed bronze at the World Individual Championships in Beijing having lost once in the pool stages and losing again to Tadtong. 
In Rio, David recovered from the disappointment of Team failure and the loss of a must-win Pool game to beat his long term Thailand rival for the first time. After the pool game, David and Sarah removed themselves from the negativity surrounding the squad. Thanks to Sarah's quick thinking a more focused individual support structure with Glynn (BC3 coach) and Dawn squad physio was created, giving David clarity. After 8 years, David became an Individual Paralympic champion.

Late career
Glynn Tromans took over coaching after Rio and David won the European championships for the third time and went through the whole 2017 season undefeated. In 2018, David reclaimed his World title at the World Championships in Liverpool completing the  "Triple crown" by being reigning Paralympic, European and World champion. 
In 2019, David defended his European title automatically qualifying for Tokyo in the process.

Covid-19
Like many people, David had to pause his Boccia career whilst the Pandemic is ongoing. He actually found a secondary purpose during the months of isolation and renewed motivation.

Restart
David's first competitive competition was the Paralympics in Tokyo. After, suffering a few technical issues in the pool, David found his top form for the Quarters, Semis and Final matches. David played live on C4 for the first time in front of millions of people to win the Gold and defend his title. 
At the end of the year, David won his 7th European title in Seville.

Domestic Boccia
David has remained unbeaten at the annual English Nationals and GB Championships since 2004 clocking up a record 16 British and 11 National titles. In 2016, David retired from the English nationals to focus on his international career.

Personal life
David is currently based at Swansea where, after completing his degree studying Aerospace Engineering at Swansea University, he is living and training full-time. He has a passion for aircraft, with a particular interest in World War II aircraft. David is a strong advocate of independent living for disabled people and is a critic of successive government cuts to spending on social care. David uses and coaches Herbalife to help people improve their health and well-being. David can drive independently using his car, which is heavily adapted. David is a patron of his former school, Treloar's in Alton. Also, he is an ambassador for the Saints Disabled Supporters' Association. David was selected to go on Dreamflight in 2003 and since then has been a regular supporter and visitor to events in successive years. He is also a drummer in his spare time as well as a keen driver and advocate of the Motability scheme.

Appearances
David has made two appearances on The Last Leg where he has performed his trademark "doughnut" in his wheelchair.

Honours and awards
Smith was given the Freedom of the Borough of Eastleigh in 2013. 

He was appointed Member of the Order of the British Empire (MBE) in the 2017 New Year Honours and Officer of the Order of the British Empire (OBE) in the 2022 New Year Honours, both for services to boccia.

References

External links 
 
 

1989 births
Living people
Paralympic boccia players of Great Britain
Paralympic gold medalists for Great Britain
Paralympic silver medalists for Great Britain
Paralympic bronze medalists for Great Britain
Paralympic medalists in boccia
Boccia players at the 2008 Summer Paralympics
Boccia players at the 2012 Summer Paralympics
Boccia players at the 2016 Summer Paralympics
Medalists at the 2008 Summer Paralympics
Medalists at the 2012 Summer Paralympics
Medalists at the 2016 Summer Paralympics
Cerebral Palsy category Paralympic competitors
Sportspeople with cerebral palsy
Officers of the Order of the British Empire
People from Eastleigh
Boccia players at the 2020 Summer Paralympics